Gică Petrescu (2 April 1915 – 18 June 2006) was a prolific Romanian folk music composer and performer. He made his debut at age 18 by joining a student band, having just graduated from the Gheorghe Șincai High School in Bucharest. His official debut was made by performing for radio audiences in 1937. Between 1937 and 1939, he carried on singing with the Radu Ghindă and Dinu Șerbănescu orchestras at the Sinaia Casino in the Carpathian Mountains.

Some music critics have compared his talent and public appeal to the likes of Frank Sinatra or Maurice Chevalier. His showmanship and charm were able to attract audiences of all ages, while his music influences combine folk with classical orchestra arrangements. He holds the record for the number of most original (composed and performed) songs (over 1,500), in an amazingly varied discography, many of which became national hits and which were covered again and again by other Romanian artists. Some of those hits are: 
Căsuţa noastră (Our Little House)
București, București (Bucharest, Bucharest)
Dă-i cu șprițul pân' la ziuă  (Drink Spritz Until Daylight)
Uite-așa aș vrea să mor (Look, This Is How I'd Like To Die)
 
On 5 May 2003, then-President of Romania Ion Iliescu appointed Gică Petrescu as a Knight of the Order of the Star of Romania as he celebrated his 88th birthday. On 18 June 2006, he was due to receive the national award "Premiile muzicale Radio România Actualități" (Radio Romania News - Musical Awards). The award was canceled, as he had died that very morning. He was 91 years old.

References

1915 births
2006 deaths
Musicians from Bucharest
Romanian composers
20th-century Romanian male singers
20th-century Romanian singers
Knights of the Order of the Star of Romania
Burials at Bellu Cemetery